In the Dungeons & Dragons fantasy roleplaying game, Tharizdun is the god of Eternal Darkness, Decay, Entropy, Malign Knowledge, Insanity, and Cold. He originated in the World of Greyhawk campaign setting but has since also appeared in other settings.

He was imprisoned ages ago by a coalition of deities to prevent the destruction of existence itself. Although imprisoned, Tharizdun still has a degree of his original multiverse-threatening power. His holy symbols are a dark spiral rune and a two-tiered inverted ziggurat known as an obex. His holy number is 333.

Publication history
Created by Gary Gygax based on Robert J. Kuntz's dark god "Tharzduun", Tharizdun first appeared in the module Forgotten Temple of Tharizdun.  He would later appear in Gygax's series of Gord novels. Writer Michal Tresca speculated that Tharizdun might have been inspired by Clark Ashton Smith's Demon Lord and ruler of the Seven Hells, Thasaidon, who appeared first in The Tomb-Spawn, Weird Tales, Vol. 23, No. 5, May 1934.

Advanced Dungeons & Dragons 1st edition (1977–1988)
Tharizdun's existence was first revealed in the module The Forgotten Temple of Tharizdun (1982), by Gary Gygax.  Tharizdun was subsequently detailed in the World of Greyhawk Fantasy Game Setting (1983).

Advanced Dungeons & Dragons 2nd edition (1989–1999)
Tharizdun was one of the deities described in the From the Ashes set (1992), for the Greyhawk campaign, and appeared again in Greyhawk: The Adventure Begins (1998).

His role in the cosmology of the Planescape campaign setting was described in On Hallowed Ground (1996).

Dungeons & Dragons 3.0 edition (2000–2003)
Tharizdun's role in the 3rd edition Greyhawk setting was defined in the Living Greyhawk Gazetteer (2000).

He was a central figure in the module Return to the Temple of Elemental Evil (2001).

Tharizdun was one of the deities detailed in Dragon #294 (2002), in the article "Beings of Power: Four Gods of Greyhawk."

Dungeons & Dragons 3.5 edition (2003–2007)
Tharizdun's priesthood is detailed for this edition in Complete Divine (2004). Details of his worship by various aberrations was detailed in Lords of Madness (2005).

Tharizdun's prison dimension was detailed in Dragon #353 (2007).

Dungeons & Dragons 4th edition (2008–2014)
Tharizdun appears as one of the deities described in the Dungeon Master's Guide (2008) for this edition. He is rarely referred to by name and usually referred to as the Chained God. The other gods imprisoned him after he used a shard of pure evil to create the Abyss. Tharizdun is worshiped mostly by rogue drow, genasi cultists and elementals, who call him the Elder Elemental Eye, falsely believing that he is a primordial and not a god. Unlike earlier editions, he has no particular affinity for aberrations and his alignment is Chaotic Evil, rather than Neutral Evil.

In the Fourth Edition Monster Manual, Tharizdun is described as creating the Abyss and the demons that live there by corrupting a portion of the elemental chaos using a shard of pure evil. For this, all the other gods (good, unaligned and evil alike) banded together to seal him away.  Fourth Edition's Dungeon Master's Guide states that Tharizdun is not mentioned by name in the Player's Handbook or in the Monster Manual due to the fact that his existence is not widely known to mortals. Those who do know of Tharizdun refer to him euphemistically as the Chained God. Most of Tharizdun's followers are elementals or have ties to elementals, and refer to him as the Elder Elemental Eye. The majority of the Elder Elemental Eye's cultists (including Tharizdun's exarchs) don't even know he is a god, thinking him instead to be a powerful primordial. The 4th edition Tharizdun is not associated with aberrations, and the location of his prison is not known.

Dungeons & Dragons 5th edition (2014–present)
Tharizdun is mentioned twice in the Player's Handbook (2014). He is listed as an example Otherworldly Patron for warlocks who make a pact with a Great Old One. He is then listed under the Greyhawk pantheon as Tharizdun, god of eternal darkness, Chaotic Evil, with the Trickery suggested Domain and either a dark spiral or inverted ziggurat as his holy symbols. Tharizdun is also mentioned in the Dungeon Master's Guide (2014), this time listed as a member of the Dawn War pantheon in the Nentir Vale setting and is listed as Tharizdun, god of madness, Chaotic Evil, with the Trickery suggested Domain and a jagged counter-clockwise spiral listed as his holy symbol.

In the adventure module Princes of the Apocalypse (2015), the four different elemental cults are attempting to release Tharizdun.

Tharizdun is listed as one of the elder evils in Mordenkainen's Tome of Foes (2018). Tharizdun is listed as a member of the Betrayer Gods for the Exandria setting in the sourcebook Explorer's Guide to Wildemount (2020) where he is also known as the Chained Oblivion. His provinces are darkness and destruction.

In the adventure module anthology Ghosts of Saltmarsh (2019), the Cult of Tharizdun is a major plot device in the final chapter set in The Styes.  A rogue Aboleth by the name Sgothgah has discovered and latched onto the alien concept of faith and is now a follower of Tharizdun.  To avoid interference and condemnation from its own kind, Sgothgah has relocated to The Styes, where he has become "The Whisper" to the local cult who consider it to be the "Voice of Tharizdun".  Sgothgah is raising a Kraken, which happens to bear markings on its body which resemble the spiral symbol of Tharizdun, a special incubator pit, which is being fueled by the negative energies of the decaying sea port.

Fictional description
Tharizdun was described in Dragon #294 as a pitch-black, roiling, amorphous form. As the Dark God, he is described as an incorporeal wraithform, black and faceless.  Gary Gygax described Tharizdun as a "primordial deity, that of matter at rest and decay of energy, viz. entropy."

Tharizdun has been depicted on the cover of Gygax's Gord the Rogue novel Come Endless Darkness as a huge, bald, humanoid man, with claws, greenish-black skin, and pointed ears.  Gygax said that in the Gord novels, "the worst and most terrible of Tharizdun's forms could come into full power and attack".

Tharizdun's "free" holy symbol is a "black sun with variegated rays". His second holy symbol of an inverted ziggurat indicates that the work of those who bound him would be overturned, according to Gygax.

Other aspects
Tharizdun is sometimes worshiped as an entity called the Elder Elemental Eye (a being similar to Ghaunadaur), but few of these worshipers recognize the two as being the same entity. Gygax himself indicated that the two creatures were separate beings. The Elder Elemental God is described as a huge, mottled, tentacled being, or as a pillar of vast elemental force with a body of burning magma, radiating steam.

Fictional history
Some say that Tharizdun originated in the Far Realm or in a previous universe. Tharizdun was imprisoned eons ago by the forebears of those beings known as the Great Powers, although it is said that Pelor was also involved. It's said that both good and evil deities worked together to ensure his imprisonment. As the Dark God, he is credited with the corruption of the Seelie Court. Through the Scorpion Crown, he is said to have destroyed the ancient kingdom of Sulm.

Tharizdun was imprisoned long ago, but his prison may weaken at times, allowing his influence to creep out into the worlds beyond. Tharizdun's temple in the Yatils is thought to have been originally defeated with the aid of the legendary Six from Shadow.

Artifacts
Tharizdun has many known artifacts. "One" that is known is actually many: a collection of gems known as the 333 Gems of Tharizdun. Their current location is unknown, but it is certain that the collection was split up long ago. Other artifacts associated with Tharizdun include the horn known as the Wailer of Tharizdun, the thermophagic sword Druniazth, and the Spear of Sorrow. The Scorpion Crown was gifted by him to the last king of Sulm. Still another artifact, the Weeping Hexagram, is in the hands of the Scarlet Brotherhood.

In Gary Gygax's Gord the Rogue Series, there were a set of three artifacts known as the Theoparts, which, combined, could free Tharizdun. Each Theopart represented one of the shades of evil (i.e., neutral, lawful, or chaotic.)

Realm
The Demiplane of Imprisonment is hidden somewhere in the depths of the Ethereal Plane, resembling a swollen, crystalline cyst nearly a mile in diameter. The ethereal substance surrounding the demiplane boils with the dreamscapes of Tharizdun's worshipers and others whose dreams the dark god invades. Within the prison, Tharizdun dreams of a multiverse where his goals succeeded, where he destroyed all of Creation and rebuilt it in his own foul image. The binding magic is less concerned with preventing his escape - which he could accomplish with ease should he discover the truth - but to prevent any outside source from informing him otherwise.

In the Dungeons and Dragons Novel Series "Abyssal Plague", Tharizdun's prison is revealed to be a universe that has long since been destroyed by that realm's own version of the Abyss known as the Voidharrow. Mildly intelligent and with the ability to corrupt and warp living creatures, the Voidharrow spent eternity alone in this realm of utter destruction until Tharizdun was imprisoned there by the other gods for his creation of the abyss. The reason behind this realm as the prison in which he would be trapped was to leave him in a realm just like the one he would have turned the multiverse into if he had been able to; with all of his power intact, he would have nothing to destroy and an infinite amount of time to lay out an infinite number of plans to free himself, only for him to have no way of implementing any of them.

Relationships
It is believed that Tharizdun has no allies, given his desire to destroy the entire universe. Should he ever escape from his prison, it is thought that even the most evil of deities would work with their good counterparts to return Tharizdun to his prison. However, the Dark God has been known to work his will secretly by employing various demons (with or without their knowledge) to do his bidding. Examples of fiends so used include Iuz and Zuggtmoy, and the Princes of Elemental Evil.

On Oerth, Tharizdun is particularly opposed by Pelor and Boccob.

Shothragot
Tharizdun created an avatar called Shothragot at the time of the Twin Cataclysms. The avatar was thought to have been destroyed, but in reality it only went into dormancy. Recently freed, Shothragot hopes to collect the 333 gems of Tharizdun and set its master free.

Fictional dogma
Tharizdun's doctrine is to destroy all and everything encountered.

Scriptures
Most of Tharizdun's ancient scriptures are long lost. The only one known to remain is the Lament for Lost Tharizdun, penned by his "last cleric," Wongas.

Worshippers
Tharizdun's worshipers are often insane. Their ultimate goal is to free their dark deity from his prison. He is rumored to be worshiped by the Scarlet Brotherhood, though these followers are actually a splinter sect of the organization known as the Black Brotherhood or The Blackthorn. The elemental cults in the original Temple of elemental evil  believed they were worshiping the destructive powers of the elements themselves, with a few believing their patron was Zuggtmoy; however, only a few knew that Tharizdun was the cults' true patron.

Tharizdun is sometimes worshiped by nonhuman aberrations such as aboleths, neogi, and grell.

Clergy
Like his lay worshipers, many of Tharizdun's priests are mad. Those who are not mad believe that they will reap great rewards and privileges for their aid in freeing him. All of his clerics are extremely secretive and trust only fellow cultists. They lead foul rituals, including human sacrifice, and search ancient sites for clues to freeing their deity. Due to Tharizdun's imprisonment, his priests must remain in contact with a site or object holding some of the Dark God's power in order to use their magic. Their favored weapon is the "spiral of decay," a bizarre weapon about which little is known. Those priests who follow Tharizdun's Elder Elemental Eye aspect have used a weapon known as a "tentacle rod" (a rod topped with animate tentacles), but it is unknown if this is the same object.

Temples
Tharizdun's temples (often in the shape of black ziggurats) are usually hidden, due to necessity. Known places of worship include an ancient temple located in the Yatil Mountains, as well as a more recently discovered temple in the Lortmils, near the Kron Hills. Although not many people in the Flanaess are aware that Tharizdun exists, it is said that public knowledge of one of his ziggurats would be enough to "raise an army of paladins".

Reception 
Tharizdun was #4 on CBR's 2020 "Dungeons & Dragons: 10 Endgame Bosses You Need To Use In Your Next Campaign" list — the article states that "What's interesting is that all of Tharizdun's followers and subjects are insane. DMs can easily make a horror insane asylum-type of adventure where deep within the institution's underbelly is a cult threatening the world by summoning and freeing Tharizdun. That ought to be full of mystery and they don't even have to kill Tharizdun, just send him back to prison".

Riley Trepanier, for GameRant, highlighted Tharizdun as a deity for players to oppose in 5th Edition. She wrote, "This elder interloper god, sometimes known as The Elder Elemental Eye, features in the Princes of the Apocalypse module as a mostly-forgotten god locked away in a prison from the Greyhawk setting, as opposed to the Forgotten Realms. [...] With such a powerful combination of powers, Tharizdun is another deity that could easily turn out to be a major reckoning for the most overconfident of parties".

In other media

 In 2019, Matthew Mercer incorporated a cult dedicated to freeing Tharizdun as a major antagonist in the second campaign of Critical Role, a Dungeons & Dragons web series.

References

Further reading

Games
 Holian, Gary. "Paladins of Greyhawk." Dragon #306. Bellevue, WA: Paizo Publishing, 2003.
Lee, Robert. "The Cradle of Madness." Dungeon #87 (Paizo Publishing, 2001).
Reynolds, Sean K. "Core Beliefs: Boccob." Dragon #338. Bellevue, WA: Paizo Publishing, 2005.
Living Greyhawk Journal no. 3 – "Gods of Oerth"
Player's Guide to Greyhawk
The Temple of Elemental Evil

Novels
Gygax, Gary. Come Endless Darkness (New Infinities, 1988).
Gygax, Gary. Dance of Demons (New Infinities, 1988).

External links
Conforti, Steven, ed. Living Greyhawk Official Listing of Deities for Use in the Campaign, version 2.0. Renton, WA: Wizards of the Coast, 2005. Available online:
Schwalb, Robert J. "Elder Evils: Shothragot." Dragon #362. Renton, WA: Wizards of the Coast, 2008. Available online: 
"The Essence of Evil." Dungeon #152. Renton, WA: Wizards of the Coast, 2007. Available online: 
"Shadow of Shothragot: The Price of Survival." Renton, WA: Wizards of the Coast, 2007. Available online: 

Dungeons & Dragons deities